Constellation is a former mining town in Yavapai County, Arizona, United States. The town was started to support the Monte Cristo Mine, which was later joined by several other mines. In 1925 the town had a post office and some 250 residents, but no trace of it is left, though ruins of the various mines surround the ghost town site.

References

Further reading

External links
 Constellation, Monte Cristo, Gold Bar & Black Rock – ghosttowns.com
 Constellation – Ghost Town of the Month at azghosttowns.com

Ghost towns in Arizona
Cemeteries in Arizona
Former populated places in Yavapai County, Arizona
Mining communities in Arizona